Walter Pashko, American, 1930–2006

"Walter Pashko studied painting in Hartford during the heyday of Chick Austin who made modern art, especially Surrealism, a great strength of the Wadsworth Atheneum. The G.I. Bill enabled him to go to Mexico City where he sought out artists who could teach him the techniques of fresco and mosaic. During his years there, he also learned how to make prints. Upon his return to America, he found a job at the School of the Museum of Fine Arts, Boston as an assistant to the printmaking instructor. Pashko was soon promoted to lead instructor when his supervisor retired. He remained at the School for over thirty years until a fall prompted him to retire in the early 1990s. Though he taught printmaking, Pashko regarded himself primarily as a painter and draftsman. He remained active in his retirement, producing the present works during his early seventies."

Works
 Still Life with Fork, Walter Pashko 1954, Farley Family Private Collection, Newport, RI

Untitled, 2002 Museum of Fine Arts, Boston  
 Untitled, (May, 22) 2002  Museum of Fine Arts, Boston

References

20th-century American painters
American male painters
21st-century American painters
21st-century American male artists
1930 births
2006 deaths
20th-century American male artists